Franco Stephan Marais (born 23 September 1992) is a South African rugby union player for Red Hurricanes in the Japanese Top League. His usual position is hooker.

In March 2018 it was announced that Marais would join Premiership Rugby side Gloucester for the 2018–19 season.

He will leave Gloucester at the end of 2019–20 season to join Japanese side Red Hurricanes. A side now under leadership of Gloucester's former head coach Johan Ackermann.

References

Living people
1992 births
South African rugby union players
Sharks (Currie Cup) players
Sharks (rugby union) players
Rugby union hookers
South Africa Under-20 international rugby union players
Gloucester Rugby players
NTT DoCoMo Red Hurricanes Osaka players
Rugby union players from Gauteng
Urayasu D-Rocks players